Christopher Buchtmann (born 25 April 1992) is a German professional footballer who plays as an attacking midfielder for VfB Oldenburg. After playing youth football for various clubs in Germany and England, Buchtmann started his professional career with 1. FC Köln. In 2012 he transferred to FC St. Pauli, where he played for ten years before joining VfB Oldenburg. He has represented Germany internationally at various youth levels, having won the UEFA European Under-17 Championship in 2009.

Club career

Early career
Buchtmann started his career at Hannover 96 before joining Borussia Dortmund when he was thirteen. He moved to England joining Liverpool youth academy. In February 2010, he left Liverpool for a reported transfer fee of £100,000 to join Fulham, where he was in the development squad after signing an 18-month contract.

However, after three months at the club, Buchtmann left Fulham to return to Germany and sign with 1. FC Köln. After two years of playing for the reserves, he made his debut for the relegated club, coming on as a substitute for Sławomir Peszko in the 68th minute as Köln lost 4–1 against Freiburg. He added another appearance in the last game of the season, in a 4–1 defeat to Bayern Munich.

In July, after a training camp in preparation of the 2012–13 season, Buchtmann was one of five players demoted to the reserve squad by coach Holger Stanislawski.

FC St. Pauli
In late August, Buchtmann left Köln to join FC St. Pauli after his contract with Köln was terminated. In January 2013, he signed a new contract with the club until 2015.

The 2013–14 season was a breakthrough for him, as he established himself in the first team. In late January, he signed a new contract with the club, which would keep him until 2016.

In March 2016, Buchtmann agreed to a contract extension until 2019.

VfB Oldenburg
Buchtmann joined 3. Liga side VfB Oldenburg in August 2022, having been released by FC St. Pauli after ten years with the club.

International career
Buchtmann represented Germany internationally at youth level and played for the under 15, under 16, under 17, under 18, under 19 and under 20 national teams. He was part of the squad that won the UEFA European Under-17 Championship. As a result of his performance, Buchtmann was named by the UEFA as one of the most promising stars in the future.

Career statistics

References

External links

1992 births
Living people
German footballers
Association football midfielders
Germany youth international footballers
Bundesliga players
2. Bundesliga players
3. Liga players
Regionalliga players
Hannover 96 players
Borussia Dortmund players
Liverpool F.C. players
Fulham F.C. players
1. FC Köln players
1. FC Köln II players
FC St. Pauli players
FC St. Pauli II players
VfB Oldenburg players